The Palm Beach Cavallino Classic is an annual Ferrari enthusiasts' event in Palm Beach, Florida, usually during the third or fourth weekend of January and widely held as the most important gathering of Ferraris in the United States. It is planned and hosted by Cavallino Magazine, the journal of Ferrari history since 1978. The Classic's goal is to celebrate the beauty, speed, history, and art of the Ferrari marque, from its inception to present day. The event is known for attracting some of the rarest and most prized Ferraris in existence - many of which not only show, but also race during the event. It also celebrates other classic Italian marques.

History 
The event started in 1992 at The Breakers, and recently celebrated its 30th anniversary at that oceanside resort. It is now considered one of the hallmarks of January in Palm Beach.

At the 25th event (January 2016), Ferrari North America introduced the new F60 America Ferrari, at The Breakers, during the event.

The Judges 
The Cavallino Classic judges vehicles on their period-correctness and originality, whether they are preserved or restored. Judges are invited from the USA and Europe. Winning vehicles become eligible for the Peninsula Hotels Best of the Best Classic Award, which only accepts winning vehicles from eight concours across the world.

Best of the Best 
In February 2021, Tom Peck's 1954 750 Monza Prototype won the 2020 Cavallino Classic Best of Show award, then went on to win the Peninsula Hotels Best of the Best Classic Award. It was the third time a car had won the Peninsula Hotels award after winning the Best of Show at the Cavallino Classic.

In 2012, the Cavallino Classic Best of Show award-winning 1962 Ferrari 250 GTO won the Peninsula Hotels award, before a 1958 Ferrari 335 Sport, won the 2019 awards.

Cavallino Magazine 
John Barnes founded Cavallino Magazine, a bimonthly magazine that debuted with the September/October 1978 issue. The first issue's cover prompted a letter of complaint from Enzo Ferrari, although the Ferrari founder admitted he was taken with the publication. After outlining some specific restrictions that had to be respected, he expressed his “sincere admirations for a beautiful publication, well done, perfectly printed, rich in historical arguments, fresh with actuality which is interesting for the many lovers of fine mechanics who love motoring”. However, he also said these words could not be quoted as a personal endorsement.

Any vehicles depicted in the Cavallino Magazine are always tagged with their chassis number, a move designed to add credibility. John Barnes said of the idea: “It certainly never crossed our minds that, 40 years later, in an entirely different car-collection world where historical research is often entrusted to professionals (given that its outcome can significantly influence the value of cars worth tens of millions of dollars), our criteria would represent a benchmark of such historical importance”.

Canossa Events 
In December 2020, Cavallino Inc. was acquired by Canossa Events, a company formed in 2010 in Reggio Emilia (Italy) to host classic car rallies and supercar motor touring events in Italy, Middle East and USA, the most famous of which is the Modena Cento Ore. In May 2019, Canossa Events partnered with Motorsport Network, the company behind Motorsport.com, Autosport.com and Motor1.com.

References

External links 
 Cavallino Classic
 Canossa Events

 Modena Cento Ore
 Motorsport Network

Ferrari